Juan Álvarez Romero, nicknamed Nito (born 5 July 1934) is a Spanish former professional footballer who played as a forward.

Career
Born in Caravaca de la Cruz, Nito played for Elche and Cádiz.

References

1934 births
Living people
Spanish footballers
Elche CF players
Cádiz CF players
Segunda División players
La Liga players
Association football forwards
People from Caravaca de la Cruz